All Their Best may refer to:

 All Their Best (The Jets album)
 All Their Best (Fun Factory album), 1996